Ladislau Lovrenschi (born 21 June 1932, date of death unknown) was a rowing coxswain. He was born in a Hungarian community in Romania, where he is also known as László Lavrenszki. He competed in the coxed pairs and coxed fours at the 1968, 1972, 1980 and 1988 Olympics and won a bronze medal in 1968 and a silver in 1988, placing fourth in 1980 and 1988. In 1970 he became the first world champion in rowing from Romania. He also won a bronze medal at the 1967 European Championships. After retiring from competition he worked as a coach at CFR Timișoara and assisted in training the Romanian national team.

References

External links
 

1932 births
Year of death missing
Romanian male rowers
Coxswains (rowing)
Olympic rowers of Romania
Rowers at the 1968 Summer Olympics
Rowers at the 1972 Summer Olympics
Rowers at the 1980 Summer Olympics
Rowers at the 1988 Summer Olympics
Olympic silver medalists for Romania
Olympic bronze medalists for Romania
Olympic medalists in rowing
World Rowing Championships medalists for Romania
Medalists at the 1988 Summer Olympics
Medalists at the 1972 Summer Olympics
European Rowing Championships medalists
Sportspeople from Timișoara
20th-century Romanian people